Methylrhenium trioxide, also known as methyltrioxorhenium(VII), is an organometallic compound with the formula CH3ReO3.  It is a volatile, colourless solid that has been used as a catalyst in some laboratory experiments. In this compound, rhenium has a tetrahedral coordination geometry with one methyl and three oxo ligands. The oxidation state of rhenium is +7.

Synthesis
Methylrhenium trioxide is commercially available. It can be prepared by many routes, a typical method is the reaction of rhenium heptoxide and tetramethyltin:
Re2O7  +  (CH3)4Sn  →  CH3ReO3  +  (CH3)3SnOReO3

Analogous alkyl and aryl derivatives are known.  Compounds of the type RReO3 are Lewis acids, forming both 1:1 and 1:2 adducts with halides and amines.

Uses
Methylrhenium trioxide serves as a heterogeneous catalyst for a variety of transformations.  Supported on alumina/silica, it catalyzes olefin metathesis at 25 °C.

In solution, MTO catalyses for the oxidations with hydrogen peroxide.  Terminal alkynes yield the corresponding acid or ester, internal alkynes yield diketones, and alkenes give epoxides. MTO also catalyses the conversion of aldehydes and diazoalkanes into an alkene, and the oxidation of amines to N-oxides with sodium percarbonate.

References

Organorhenium compounds